The Old Ship Street Historic District is a historic district on both sides of Pleasant St. from Riverside Ave. to Park Street in Medford, Massachusetts.  The district is based around shipyard established in 1803 by Thatcher Magoun, which operated into the 1870s.  None of the industrial shipyard facilities have survived, leaving the area as a predominantly residential area.  Most of the housing in the area derives from the first few decades of the shipyard's existence, resulting in a significant number of Federal and Greek Revival houses, built roughly between 1803 and 1855.

The district was added to the National Register of Historic Places in 1975.

See also
National Register of Historic Places listings in Medford, Massachusetts
National Register of Historic Places listings in Middlesex County, Massachusetts

References

Historic districts in Middlesex County, Massachusetts
Medford, Massachusetts
National Register of Historic Places in Medford, Massachusetts
Historic districts on the National Register of Historic Places in Massachusetts